T.A.G. is a DOS-based bulletin board system (BBS) computer program, released from 1986 to 2000.

History
T.A.G. was written in Borland Pascal and is free for business or personal use. The authors considered it fun to give the program away while others tried to charge for BBS programs. The software was a fork from an early version of the WWIV source code.

A quote from one of the authors:
 We all poured countless hours into the development and support of people running BBSs. Even today I don't think the internet has come close to the sense of community and simple accomplishment that BBSing provided. Building and running a complete environment on your local computer and watching people use it is a far different experience than putting up a web page on some remote server. We all made and still have a great many friends from being sysops and BBS developers.

Other Notes:
 No one ever got them to answer definitively on what their name stood for, but there was a reasonably reliable rumor that it was from "The Adventurer's Guild" which was a Dungeons and Dragons sort of reference.

The last known running T.A.G. BBS, 'The Diskbox ][' is available using a telnet program at tag.diskbox2.net on port 23.

Intro Screen

The intro screen to the T.A.G. BBS login was:

   /\/\/\/\/\/\/\/\/\/\/\/\/\/\/\/\/\/\/\/\/\/\/\/\/\/\/\/\/\/\/\/\/\/\/\/\/\
  /\/\/\/                     [>> Welcome to <<]                       \/\/\/\
 |   /\/      __        __          ___         \/\   |
 |  / /      /             /|      /     /|        /          /\         \ \  |
 | / /       TTTTTTTTTTTTTT/       AAAAAA /|       GGGGGGGGGGG\/|         \ \ |
 |/\/ /\           TT |           AA|___AA /|      GG |      GG/        /\ \/\|
 |-< <  >          TT |          AA/     AA /|     GG |   _        <  > >-|
 |\/\ \/           TT |         AAAAAAAAAAAA |     GG |  /     /|       \/ /\/|
 | \ \             TT |         AA |      AA |     GG |__GGGGGG |         / / |
 |  \ \            TT |         AA |      AA |     GG/       GG |        / /  |
 |   \/\           TT/   <>     AA/       AA/  <>   GGGGGGGGGGG/  <>    /\/   |
  \/\/\/\                                                              /\/\/\/
   \/\/\/\/\/\/\/\/\/\/\/\/\/\/\/\/\/\/\/\/\/\/\/\/\/\/\/\/\/\/\/\/\/\/\/\/\/

Authors 
Victor Capton, Randy Goebel, Alan Jurison, Paul Loeber, Robert Numerick and Paul Williams.
All live in the Detroit (MI) area except Alan Jurison who lives in Syracuse (NY).

Users
Peak number of running systems: Just over 1000, mostly in the United States and Canada. The largest concentration was in the Detroit area, where it was one of most popular BBS software run in the area. There was a somewhat friendly rivalry with the Telegard team, which also started in the same area.

Locations
 Michigan: Detroit (where it started), Lansing, Flint and Battle Creek
 California: Oakland
 Connecticut: Hartford
 Florida: Jacksonville and Cocoa
 Maryland: Baltimore
 New Jersey: Newark
 New York: Syracuse
 North Carolina: Raleigh
 Ontario, Canada: Windsor and Hamilton
 Pennsylvania: Pittsburgh
 Texas: Houston, Beaumont and Fort Worth
 Virginia: Norfolk

The last known T.A.G. BBS still operating can be contacted by telnet at tag.diskbox2.net. Note: ANSI support is required to connect to weed out port scanners.

References

Bulletin board system software
DOS software
Computer-related introductions in 1986